Richard Charles Houston (November 16, 1945 – December 11, 1982) was an American football wide receiver who played five seasons with the New York Giants of the National Football League (NFL). He was drafted by the New York Giants in the fourth round of the 1969 NFL Draft. He played college football at East Texas State University and attended Dunbar High School in Texarkana, Texas. Houston was killed in a car crash on December 11, 1982.

References

External links
Just Sports Stats

1945 births
1982 deaths
Players of American football from Texas
American football wide receivers
African-American players of American football
Texas A&M–Commerce Lions football players
New York Giants players
People from Texarkana, Texas
Road incident deaths in New Jersey
20th-century African-American sportspeople